Johnny Cool is a 1963 American neo-noir crime film directed by William Asher based on the novel The Kingdom of Johnny Cool by John McPartland which stars Henry Silva and Elizabeth Montgomery. Produced in part by Peter Lawford, Johnny Cool features a cast that also includes Mort Sahl, Telly Savalas, Jim Backus, Joey Bishop, and Sammy Davis Jr., who also sings the theme song.

Plot
Johnny Colini, an exiled American living in Rome, rescues Salvatore Giordano, a young Sicilian outlaw, from the police. After Giordano is groomed, polished, and renamed "Johnny Cool", Colini sends him on a  mission of vengeance to the United States to assassinate the men who plotted his downfall and enforced exile. Johnny arrives in New York and quickly kills several of the underworld figures on Colini's list.

Meanwhile, he picks up Darien "Dare" Guinness, a wealthy divorcée who becomes his accomplice, she is later severely beaten by the gangsters as a warning to Johnny against pursuing his vendetta. Soon the FBI becomes involved, and when Johnny and Dare bomb the Hollywood home of gangster Lennart Crandall, the police are able to identify Dare's car when she panics and leaves it parked on the street. The two had separated and planned to meet later, but Dare, abruptly realizing that Johnny is a vicious killer, tells his enemies where to find him. She then surrenders herself to the FBI, as Johnny is being tortured by his captors at the film's conclusion.

Cast
Henry Silva as Johnny Cool / Salvatore Giordano
Elizabeth Montgomery as Darien "Dare" Guinness
Richard Anderson as Correspondent
Jim Backus as Louis Murphy
Joey Bishop as Holmes
Brad Dexter as Lennart Crandall
Mort Sahl as Ben Morrow
Hank Henry as Larry
Telly Savalas as Vincenzo 'Vince' Santangelo
Sammy Davis Jr. as Educated
Marc Lawrence as Johnny Colini
John McGiver as Oscar B. 'Oby' Hinds
Gregory Morton as Jerry March
Joseph Calleia as tourist
Clegg Hoyt as Craps Player

Film score and soundtrack

The film score was composed, arranged and conducted by Billy May, and the soundtrack album was released on the United Artists label in 1963. Allmusic's Steven McDonald noted "This soundtrack manages to mix the early '60s caper-flick brand of jazz with the darker feel of 1950s film noir – a genre to which Johnny Cool was a deliberate throwback."

Track listing
All compositions by Billy May except as indicated
 "The Lizard" - 2:38
 "Window Washer" - 2:37
 "Dare's Affair" - 2:40
 "Borrow a Knife" - 1:47
 "Johnny Cool Theme" - 2:19
 "Morning in Balboa" - 2:14
 "Nice Quiet Saloon" - 2:35
 "Green Tables Blues" - 3:16
 "The Coolest Pad" - 3:18
 "Juan Coolisto" - 2:19
 "Bee Bom" (Les Vandyke) - 2:14
 "The Ballad Of Johnny Cool" (Jimmy Van Heusen, Sammy Cahn) - 2:58

Personnel
Orchestra arranged and conducted by Billy May
Sammy Davis Jr. - vocals (tracks 11 & 12)

References

External links
 
 

1963 films
1963 crime drama films
American black-and-white films
American crime drama films
American neo-noir films
1960s English-language films
Films about organized crime in the United States
American films about revenge
Films based on American novels
Films directed by William Asher
Films scored by Billy May
Mafia films
1960s American films